George Ashley Wilkes is a fictional character in Margaret Mitchell's  1936 novel Gone with the Wind and the 1939 film of the same name. The character also appears in the 1991 book Scarlett, a sequel to Gone with the Wind written by Alexandra Ripley, and in Rhett Butler's People (2007) by Donald McCaig.

Fictional biography
Ashley is the man with whom Scarlett O'Hara is obsessed. Gentlemanly yet indecisive, he loves Scarlett, but finds he has more in common with Melanie, his first cousin and later his wife. However, he is tormented by his attraction to Scarlett.  Unfortunately for him and Scarlett, his failure to deal with his true feelings for her ruins any chance she has for real happiness with Rhett Butler. Ashley is a complicated character. He is not sympathetic to the cause of the North. However, he isn't an ardent Confederate patriot, either. What Ashley loves about the South is the serene, peaceful life that he and his dear ones know at Twelve Oaks and similar plantations. At one point (following the war) he comments to Scarlett that "had the war not come he would have spent his life happily  buried at Twelve Oaks."

In short, Ashley loves the South, but not necessarily the Confederacy. And he hates war, even telling his friends in the beginning of the book who are eager to start fighting the North that "most of the misery in the world has been caused by war", though he fights because of his loyalty to the above-mentioned peaceful life he had in Georgia. Ashley serves as an officer in Cobb's Legion.

He claims that he would have freed the slaves after the death of his father if the war hadn't freed them already.  His willingness to free the slaves further demonstrates his impractical nature, because if the slaves were free, he would not be able to run the plantation.  However, he has a great deal of affection for the slaves on his plantation, and the role that they played in his serene, bucolic life.

There is a sense in which the end of Ashley's life (as he knew it) is more than just the burning of Twelve Oaks. The four Tarleton brothers (Boyd, Tom, Brent and Stuart) are all killed, three of them at Gettysburg. Cade Calvert returns home terminally ill from tuberculosis. Little Joe Fontaine is killed in battle, and Tony Fontaine has to flee forever to Texas after killing a Yankee (specifically, Scarlett's family's former slave overseer, Jonas Wilkerson, during Reconstruction; after Wilkerson encouraged a former slave to attempt to rape Tony's sister-in-law). These were Ashley's childhood friends, all represented in the happy scene at the barbecue, close to the beginning of the book. When the "family circle" of the county is decimated, the life Ashley loved is gone.

At one point in the book Ashley pleads, in vain, with his wife Melanie to move to the North, after he comes back from fighting in the war. This isn't, however, because of any affection for the North, but because he wants to be able to stand on his own as a man, something he will never again be able to do in Georgia now that his plantation is gone and his home burned. However, he ends up working for Scarlett due to her manipulative entreaties and Melanie's naive support of her. Melanie also states that if they move to New York, Beau will not be able to go to school.  This is because in New York black children are allowed to attend class, and they could not permit Beau to attend class with black children. In Georgia the schools were segregated by race, so Beau would be able to attend school if they remained in the South.

Role
In a sense, he is the character best personifying the tragedy of the Southern upper class after the Civil War. Coming from a privileged background, Ashley is an honorable and educated man. He is in clear contrast to Rhett Butler, who is decisive and full of life. Rhett is both ruthless and practical, and is willing to do whatever he must to survive.  In contrast, Ashley is often impractical (even Melanie admits this on her deathbed), and would resist doing many things Rhett would do because they aren't "proper" or "gentlemanly". Ashley fights in the Civil War, but he does it out of love for his homeland and not a hatred of the Yankees, who he actually hopes will just leave the South in peace.  As a soldier he shows enough leadership to be promoted to the rank of Major, and survives being imprisoned at the Rock Island Arsenal in Illinois (a notorious prisoner-of-war camp) for several months. He eventually returns home, still able-bodied. Ashley could have lived a peaceful and respectable life had the War never taken place. The War that changed the South forever has turned his world upside down, with everything he had believed in 'gone with the wind', a phrase composed by the poet Ernest Dowson.  

Fictional American Civil War veterans
Literary characters introduced in 1936
Fictional characters involved in incest
Fictional slave owners
Fictional people of the Confederate States of America
Fictional soldiers
Gone with the Wind characters
Male characters in literature
Male characters in film
Fictional characters from Georgia (U.S. state)